Lloydsville is an unincorporated community in Unity Township, Westmoreland County, Pennsylvania, United States. Lloydsville is 1,080 feet (329 m) above sea level. The zip code is 15650.

The post office for Lloydsville is located in Latrobe.

References

Unincorporated communities in Pennsylvania
Unincorporated communities in Westmoreland County, Pennsylvania
Pittsburgh metropolitan area